Kompania Zamkowa (Castle Company) was the military unit the size of an infantry company, responsible for providing protection for the President of the Republic of Poland from 1926 to 1939. They also had a ceremonial function.

Castle Company, named after Royal Castle, Warsaw, then a presidential residence, consisted of:
 Commanding squad
 Three infantry platoons
 Heavy machine gun platoon
 Gendarmerie platoon

The Company was created after disbanding the Presidential military office and the previous protective squad. The only President under its protection was Ignacy Mościcki.

In 1928 Company was merged with a castle motorcade, gendarmerie platoon and horse unit to for the Castle Unit.

Commanders:
 Major Stanisław Kłopotowski
 Captain Witold Grębo
 Captain Zygmunt Roszkowski
 Major Wiktor Gębalski

References

Polish ceremonial units
Military history of Poland
Second Polish Republic
Protective security units